The 1992 NCAA Division I-AA Football Championship Game was a postseason college football game between the Youngstown State Penguins and the Marshall Thundering Herd. The game was played on December 19, 1992, at Marshall University Stadium in Huntington, West Virginia. The culminating game of the 1992 NCAA Division I-AA football season, it was won by Marshall, 31–28. The game was a rematch of the prior season's championship game.

Teams
The participants of the Championship Game were the finalists of the 1992 I-AA Playoffs, which began with a 16-team bracket. The site of the title game, Marshall University Stadium, had been predetermined months earlier.

Youngstown State Penguins

Youngstown State finished their regular season with an 8–2–1 record. Unseeded in the tournament and ranked seventh in the final NCAA I-AA in-house poll, the Penguins defeated Villanova, second-seed The Citadel, and third-seed Northern Iowa to reach the final. This was the second appearance, both consecutively and overall, for Youngstown State in a Division I-AA championship game, having won in 1991.

Marshall Thundering Herd

Marshall finished their regular season with an 8–3 record (5–2 in conference). Unseeded and ranked sixth in the final NCAA I-AA in-house poll, the Thundering Herd defeated Eastern Kentucky, fourth-seed Middle Tennessee, and Delaware to reach the final. This was the third appearance overall, and second consecutively, for Marshall in a Division I-AA championship game, having lost in 1987 and 1991.

Game summary
After a scoreless first quarter, Marshall led 14–0 at halftime, and extended their lead to 28–0 with 5:46 left in the third quarter. Youngstown State then rallied, cutting the lead to 28–14 by the end of the third quarter, and tying the game with 2:28 left in the fourth quarter. Marshall then drove from their 19-yard-line to the Youngstown State 5-yard-line, and senior kicker Willy Merrick made a 22-yard-field goal with seven seconds left to play, providing the winning points for Marshall. It was Merrick's first collegiate field goal, as the team's usual kicker, Merrick's sophomore brother David, was suspended for the game due to missing a practice.

Scoring summary

Game statistics

References

Further reading

External links
 Marshall University's 1st 1-AA Win From 1992 via YouTube

Championship Game
NCAA Division I Football Championship Games
Marshall Thundering Herd football games
Youngstown State Penguins football games
Sports competitions in West Virginia
NCAA Division I-AA Football Championship Game
NCAA Division I-AA Football Championship Game